Gustav Carl Luders, sometimes written Gustave Luders, (December 13, 1865 — January 24, 1913) was a musician who wrote the music for various songs and shows in the U.S. He was born in Bremen, Germany. He came to the U.S. in 1888 and lived in Milwaukee and then Chicago. He was known for his musical comedies. His The Prince of Pilsen was adapted into the film The Prince of Pilsen. 

Luders teamed with writers George Ade and Frank Pixley. The Lester S. Levy Sheet Music Collection at Johns Hopkins has several of his works.

Work
The Burgomaster with Frank Pixley
By the Sad Sea Waves (musical)
King Dodo (1901) with Frank Pixley
Woodland (1904)
The Grand Mogul (1906)
Marcelle (1908)
The Gypsy (1912)
Mam'selle Napoleon
The Prince of Pilsen
The Sho-gun (play) (1904-1905)
The Fair Co-ed
The old town: A musical farce in two acts

References

External links
Findagrave entry

1865 births
1913 deaths
Musicians from Bremen
German emigrants to the United States
American musical theatre composers